Much Wenlock is a civil parish in Shropshire, England.  It contains 104 listed buildings that are recorded in the National Heritage List for England.  Of these, three are listed at Grade I, the highest of the three grades, six are at Grade II*, the middle grade, and the others are at Grade II, the lowest grade.  The parish includes the town of Much Wenlock and the surrounding countryside which contains smaller settlements, including Bourton and Wyke.  A high proportion of the listed buildings are in or near the centre of the town, and most are houses, cottages, shops, public houses, many of which are timber framed or have timber framed cores.  The other listed buildings in the town include two wells, a church, the remains of a priory, and civic buildings.  In the surrounding countryside are country houses and associated structures, farmhouses and farm buildings, a disused windmill, a war memorial, and another church.


Key

Buildings

References

Citations

Sources

Lists of buildings and structures in Shropshire
Listed